The 1999 Sanex Trophy doubles was the doubles event of the first edition of the Sanex Trophy; a WTA Tier IV tournament and one of the most prestigious women's tennis tournament held in Belgium.

Eva Martincová and Elena Wagner won the title, which was Martincová's first and only doubles title, and Wagner's third doubles title.

Seeds

Draw

Qualifying

Seeds
  Giulia Casoni /  Maria Paola Zavagli (first round)
  Conchita Martínez Granados /  María Sánchez Lorenzo (first round)

Qualifiers
  Petra Begerow /  Antonella Serra Zanetti
 ''' Hannah Collin /  Marta Marrero

Qualifying draw

First qualifier

Second qualifier

External links
 1999 Sanex Trophy Draw

WTA Knokke-Heist
Sanex Trophy